Girl Thing is the self-titled debut and only studio album by British-Dutch girl group Girl Thing. The album is a mix of 2000s girl pop and 1970s disco. It features 16 tracks including the singles "Last One Standing", "Girls on Top" and "Young, Free and Happy", which was only released in Australia and New Zealand. The album is notable in that it includes the song "Pure and Simple", which was released as the debut single by Popstars winners Hear'Say and went on to sell over 1 million copies.

Although Girl Thing are an English group, due to poor sales of their second single "Girls on Top", the album was not initially released in the UK. The album was released on 13 November 2000 in Australia, where it peaked at number 92 on the Australian albums chart. The album was finally released in the UK on iTunes 13 years after its original release, coinciding with the group's appearance on the ITV2 television series The Big Reunion.

Track listing

Charts

References

2000 debut albums
Girl Thing albums